Nirgua is one of the 14 municipalities of the state of Yaracuy, Venezuela.

References

Municipalities of Yaracuy